Paul Andrew Broadhurst (born 14 August 1965) is an English professional golfer. He won six times on the European Tour and played in the 1991 Ryder Cup. Since turning 50, he has had success in senior events, winning the 2016 Senior Open Championship and the 2018 Senior PGA Championship.

Career
Broadhurst was the leading amateur at the 1988 Open Championship. He joined the European Tour in 1989 and picked up his first win at the Credit Lyonnais Cannes Open that year, and was the Sir Henry Cotton Rookie of the Year. Further European Tour wins followed in 1991, 1993 and in 1995, when he won the Open de France (French Open). He played in the Ryder Cup in 1991. His highest finish on the European Tour Order of Merit is ninth in 1996.

Broadhurst suffered a serious injury to his right hand during the second round of the 2000 Dubai Desert Classic, and was unable to compete for the remainder of that season. He also struggled in 2001 and 2002, but improved to 89th in the Order of Merit in 2003, thus regaining full exempt status. In 2005, he picked up his fifth European Tour win, and his first for a decade, at the Portuguese Open and in 2006 he made a successful defence of his title. Broadhurst's run of good form in 2006 enabled him to reach a career-high of 46th in the Official World Golf Rankings. He holds the Open Championship record for the best scoring round (−9) in relation to par, set in 1990 and equalled by Rory McIlroy in 2010. He played in his 500th European Tour event at the 2008 BMW PGA Championship at Wentworth Golf Club.

After turning 50 in August 2015, Broadhurst had immediate success on the European Senior Tour, winning the Prostate Cancer UK Scottish Senior Open the same month. In 2016 he won the Senior Open Championship and the Nature Valley First Tee Open at Pebble Beach on the PGA Tour Champions. In 2017 he had further wins on the European Senior Tour, winning the Scottish Senior Open for a second time, and the Paris Legends Championship. In 2018 he won the Senior PGA Championship by shooting a bogey-free final round 63, including a 30-foot putt to save par on the 14th hole.

In 2021, Broadhurst won the Staysure PGA Seniors Championship for his sixth victory on the European Senior Tour.

Personal life
Broadhurst's son Sam is also a professional golfer, who played on the PGA EuroPro Tour.

Amateur wins
1988 Lytham Trophy

Professional wins (20)

European Tour wins (6)

*Note: The 1989 Credit Lyonnais Cannes Open was shortened to 54 holes due to rain.

European Tour playoff record (0–4)

Other wins (5)
1990 Motorola Classic (England)
1995 J. P. McManus Pro-Am (shared title with Richard Boxall)
2012 Cornish Festival (tie with Simon Lilly)
2014 Midland Professional Championship
2015 Cornish Festival

PGA Tour Champions wins (5)

PGA Tour Champions playoff record (1–1)

European Senior Tour wins (6)

European Senior Tour playoff record (1–1)

Results in major championships

Note: Broadhurst never played in the Masters Tournament.

LA = Low amateur
CUT = missed the halfway cut
"T" indicates a tie for a place.

Results in World Golf Championships

QF, R16, R32, R64 = Round in which player lost in match play
"T" = Tied

Senior major championships

Wins (2)

Results timeline
Results not in chronological order before 2022.

"T" indicates a tie for a place
NT = No tournament due to COVID-19 pandemic

Team appearances
Amateur
European Boys' Team Championship (representing England): 1983
European Amateur Team Championship (representing England): 1987
St Andrews Trophy (representing Great Britain & Ireland): 1988 (winners)

Professional
Dunhill Cup (representing England): 1991
Four Tours World Championship (representing Europe): 1991 (winners)
Ryder Cup (representing Europe): 1991
World Cup (representing England): 1995, 1997

References

External links

English male golfers
European Tour golfers
European Senior Tour golfers
PGA Tour Champions golfers
Winners of senior major golf championships
Ryder Cup competitors for Europe
Sportspeople from Walsall
People from Atherstone
1965 births
Living people